The Dervish and Death is a 1974 Yugoslav film directed by Zdravko Velimirović based on the novel of the same name by Meša Selimović.

The film won Silver Arena (as second best film) and four Golden Arena awards at the 1974 Pula Film Festival, the Yugoslav national film awards festival, including Best Director (Zdravko Velimirović), Best Supporting Actor (Abdurrahman Shala), Best Cinematography (Nenad Jovičić) and Best Production Design (Vlastimir Gavrik).

It was Yugoslavia's submission to the 47th Academy Awards for the Academy Award for Best Foreign Language Film, but was not accepted as a nominee.

Cast
 Voja Mirić as Ahmed Nurudin (the Dervish)
 Boris Dvornik as Hasan, his friend
 Bata Živojinović as Muselim
 Faruk Begolli as Mula Jusuf
 Veljko Mandic as Kara Zaim
 Olivera Katarina as Kadinica
 Dragomir Felba as Hadzi Sinanudin
 Pavle Vujisić as Mufti

See also
 Cinema of Yugoslavia
 List of submissions to the 47th Academy Awards for Best Foreign Language Film
 List of Yugoslav submissions for the Academy Award for Best Foreign Language Film

References

External links

1974 films
Serbian drama films
1974 drama films
Serbo-Croatian-language films
Films directed by Zdravko Velimirović
Films based on Serbian novels
Yugoslav drama films
Films set in Sarajevo